Salvo is an Italian surname which may refer to:

People 
 Albert Salvo (1931–1973), American serial killer
 Antonio Salvo (died 1986), Italian businessman
 Ignazio Salvo (died 1992), Italian businessman
 Manny Salvo (1913–1997), American baseball player

Fictional characters 
 Juan Salvo, in the Argentine comic El Eternauta

See also 
 DeSalvo, a list of people or fictional characters with the surname DeSalvo or De Salvo
 DeSalvo, a list of people with the surname DiSalvo or Di Salvo
 Salvio

Italian-language surnames